Gerhard Zebrowski (born 25 April 1940 – 30 April 2020) was a German footballer who played as a winger. He spent six seasons in the Bundesliga with SV Werder Bremen winning the league in the 1964–65 season and the DFB-Pokal in 1961.

Career

Werder Bremen
Born in Bremen, Zebrowski grew up in the urban district of Walle where he played youth football with local team TuS Walle. He joined SV Werder Bremen at the age of 13 and made his debut in the Oberliga Nord, the German top tier at the time. Werder Bremen finished runners-up multiple times in the Oberliga with Zebrowski contributing 27 goals in 71 Oberliga matches.

He won the 1961 DFB-Pokal with Werder Bremen.

Two years after the Bundesliga was founded Zebrowski helped Werder Bremen win it, finishing the 1964–65 season as the club's second top scorer with 11 goals.

He played a total of 145 Bundesliga matches scoring 40 goals for Werder Bremen.

Later years with Bremerhaven 93 and SV Hemelingen
In 1969, Zebrowski moved to TuS Bremerhaven 93, a smaller club in the state of Bremen playing in the Regionalliga Nord, which was the German second tier at the time. He ended his career with Bremen-based amateur side SV Hemelingen.

Post-playing career
Following his retirement he published the "Werder-Echo", Werder Bremen's matchday programme, together with Klaus Matischak, also a former player of the club. An honorary member of the club, Zebrowski regularly visited matches at the Weserstadion until his death.

Death
He died on 30 April 2020, days after his 80th birthday.

Style of play
Zebrowski played as a winger and was known for his pace and dribbling.

Honours
Werder Bremen
 Bundesliga: 1964–65; runners-up 1968
 DFB-Pokal: 1961

References

External links
 
 

1940 births
2020 deaths
Association football forwards
German footballers
SV Werder Bremen players
Bundesliga players
Footballers from Bremen